Egypt–Korea relations may refer to:

 Egypt–North Korea relations
 Egypt–South Korea relations